This is a discography of the rock band Family. They have released 7 studio albums, 5 live albums, 10 compilation albums and 14 singles.

Albums

Studio albums

Live albums

Compilation albums

Singles

Notes

References

Discographies of British artists
Rock music group discographies